is the generic name given to limited-stop commuter train services operated by railway companies in Japan, which require the purchase of a supplementary  or  in addition to the base fare ticket. The supplementary ticket guarantees passengers a seat on board. This article describes all commuter services in Japan fitting this definition, regardless of whether their names actually include the title "Home Liner".

These services generally use express or limited-express train rolling stock, and the early morning inbound and late evening outbound movements often form an effective way to move rolling stock being to or from depots in preparation for the next day's operations.

History
The name "Home Liner" was first coined in June 1984 by JNR when an empty stock working for an Asama 189 series EMU was used to carry passengers from Ueno to Ōmiya on the Tōhoku Main Line in the evening for a supplementary fare of 300 yen. Initially, only four of the twelve cars in the train were made available to passengers, but the popularity of the service resulted in three evening Home Liner trains being introduced from Ueno to Ōmiya from September 1984. The first morning Liner service appeared in November 1986 with the introduction of the Shōnan Liner from Odawara to Tokyo on the Tōkaidō Main Line, and the Hanwa Liner from Wakayama to Tennōji on the Hanwa Line. JR West has since discontinued Home Liner services, replacing them with extra limited express or rapid trains.

Fares
Additional fares required to ride JR Group home liner trains are as follows:
JR Hokkaido – 310 yen (jōsha seiriken)
JR East (Greater Tokyo Area) – 500 yen (Liner Ticket)
JR East (Niigata and Nagano areas) – 310 yen (jōsha seiriken)
JR Central – 320 yen (jōsha seiriken)(Shizuoka Area)
JR Kyushu – 300 yen (jōsha seiriken)

List of services

JR Hokkaido

JR East

JR Central

JR Kyushu

Private railways

References

Passenger rail transport in Japan